The red-tailed litter-skink (Lygisaurus malleolus) is a species of skink found in Queensland in Australia.

References

Lygisaurus
Reptiles described in 2005
Skinks of Australia
Endemic fauna of Australia
Taxa named by Lewis Roberts (naturalist)